At the 1993 Summer Universiade, the athletics events were held at the University at Buffalo Stadium in Amherst, New York in the United States from July 14 to 18. A total of 43 events were contested, of which 23 by male and 20 by female athletes.

Variable and windy conditions meant that performances were lower compared to previous years. However, two Universiade records were broken during the competition; Kenya's Kennedy Manyisa improved the men's marathon time and Robert Korzeniowski of Poland bettered the 20 km walk standard. The women's 3000 metres was contested for the last time at the games and it was replaced by the 5000 metres from 1995 onwards.

Derrick Adkins, István Bagyula, Aleksandr Klimenko and Robert Korzeniowski, champions at the 1991 Universiade, all returned and defended their titles. Korzeniowski and Adkins went on to win Olympic gold medals at the 1996 Atlanta Olympics, as did hammer throw runner-up Balázs Kiss and pole vault bronze medallist Jean Galfione. Moroccan Khalid Khannouchi won his first international medal in the 5000 metres and permanently settled in the United States around this period.

The United States, the host nation, easily topped the medal table with fourteen gold medals and thirty-seven medals in total. Poland won the next highest number of events, with three gold medallists, while Cuba had the next highest total medal tally with eight medals. Germany, Romania, Ukraine and Japan were other nations who performed well. Thirty-seven nations reached the medal table in the athletics competition. All athletes from Yugoslavia competed as independent participants, due to United Nations sanctions.

Medal summary

Men

Women

Medal table

 † = All athletes from Yugoslavia entered the games as "Independent Participants" due to United Nations sanctions against the country.

References

 World Student Games (Universiade – Men). GBR Athletics. Retrieved on 2012-06-21.
 World Student Games (Universiade – Women). GBR Athletics. Retrieved on 2012-06-21.
 Results of The 17th Universiade '93 Buffalo: Athletics. Retrieved on 2012-06-21.
 

 
1993
Universiade
1993 Summer Universiade
1993 Universiade